Desilu Productions was an American television production company founded and co-owned by husband and wife Desi Arnaz and Lucille Ball. The company is best known for shows such as I Love Lucy, The Lucy Show, Mannix, The Untouchables, Mission: Impossible and Star Trek. Until 1962, Desilu was the second-largest independent television production company in the United States, behind MCA's Revue Studios, until MCA bought Universal Pictures and Desilu became and remained the number-one independent production company, until being sold in 1968.

Ball and Arnaz jointly owned the majority stake in Desilu from its inception until 1962, when Ball bought out Arnaz and ran the company by herself for several years. Ball had succeeded in making Desilu profitable again by 1968, when she sold her shares of Desilu to Gulf+Western for $17 million (a valued $ in ). Gulf+Western then transformed Desilu into the television production arm of Paramount Pictures, rebranding the company as the original Paramount Television.

Desilu's entire library is owned by Paramount Global through two of its subsidiaries. The CBS unit owns all Desilu properties that were produced and concluded before 1960, which were sold to CBS by Desilu itself. Its CBS Studios unit owns the rights to everything Desilu produced after 1960 as successor in interest to Paramount Television.

History 
Desilu Productions was formed in 1950 using the combined names of "Desi Arnaz" and "Lucille Ball". It was created to produce Lucy and Desi's vaudeville act as a television series and sell it to Columbia Broadcasting System (CBS) executives. Arnaz and Ball wanted to adapt Ball's CBS radio series My Favorite Husband to television. The television project eventually became I Love Lucy. During the show's first few years, Desilu rented space at General Service Studios (now the Sunset Las Palmas Studios) at Santa Monica Boulevard and North Las Palmas Avenue. They used Stage Two, which was named Desilu Playhouse. Later, a special entrance was added at 6633 Romaine Street, on the south side of the lot, to allow direct access to it.

Ball's role in the company 
Ball's contribution was more on the artistic side. She was skilled at proposing new programs that were popular to broad audiences and successful in both their original broadcasts and syndication reruns. Before starring in I Love Lucy, she starred in many B movies, and had a good idea of what television audiences wanted.

She approved original production concepts (such as The Untouchables and Star Trek) for development into broadcast series, assessing how the public would enjoy them and their potential for long-term success. This led to continued profits from the programs through reruns, which would recover their high development and production costs. Even decades after the absorption of Desilu Productions and the production end of all original series Desilu approved for development, some series have achieved enduring success and, in some cases, redevelopment into feature-length movie franchises in their own right. Examples are The Untouchables, Star Trek and Mission Impossible.

Arnaz's role in the company 
Much of Desilu Productions' early success can be traced to Arnaz's unusual business style in his role as producer of I Love Lucy. For example, lacking formal business training, he knew nothing of amortization and often included all the costs incurred by the production into the first episode of a season rather than spreading them across the projected number of episodes in the year. As a result, by the end of the season, episodes were nearly entirely paid for, at preposterously low figures.

At that time, most television programs were broadcast live, and as the largest markets were in New York, the rest of the country received only images derived from kinescopes. Karl Freund, the cameraman on I Love Lucy, and Arnaz himself have been credited with the development of the linked multifilm camera setup using adjacent sets in front of a live audience that became the standard production method for situation comedy. The use of film enabled every station around the country to broadcast high-quality images of the show. Arnaz was told it was impossible to allow an audience onto a sound stage, but he worked with Freund to design sets that accommodated audiences, allowed filming, and adhered to fire, health, and safety codes.

Network executives considered the use of film an unnecessary extravagance. Arnaz persuaded them to allow Desilu to cover all additional costs associated with filming, rather than broadcasting live, under the stipulation that Desilu owned and controlled all rights to the film prints and negatives. Arnaz's unprecedented arrangement is widely considered to be one of the shrewdest deals in television history. As a result of his foresight, Desilu reaped the profits from all reruns of the series.

Early years 
Desilu soon outgrew its first space and in 1954 bought its own studio, the Motion Picture Center on Cahuenga Boulevard in Hollywood, what is now Red Studios Hollywood. Most of the I Love Lucy episodes were produced there.

In late 1957, the company bought the RKO Pictures production facilities for $6 million from General Tire and Rubber, including RKO's main facilities on Gower Street in Hollywood and the RKO-Pathé lot (now Culver Studios) in Culver City. This purchase included Forty Acres, the backlot where exteriors for Mayberry were filmed. These acquisitions gave the Ball-Arnaz TV empire a total of 33 sound stages — four more than Metro-Goldwyn-Mayer and eleven more than Twentieth Century-Fox had in 1957.

The studio's initial attempt to become involved in film production was the film Forever, Darling (1956), Arnaz and Ball's followup to their highly successful MGM release The Long, Long Trailer (1954), but it was a box-office failure. It was produced at Desilu, but under the banner of Zanra Productions (Arnaz spelled backward). Most subsequent attempts to bring projects to the big screen were aborted until Yours, Mine and Ours (1968) with Ball and Henry Fonda. This film was a critical and financial success.

In 1960, Desi Arnaz sold the pre-1960s shows to CBS. Desilu Productions retained ownership of those shows that premiered after 1960, and were still in production.

Ball as sole owner 

Ball and Arnaz divorced in 1960. In November 1962, Arnaz resigned as president when his holdings in the company were bought out by Ball, who succeeded him as president. Ball served as president and chief executive officer of Desilu while at the same time starring in her own weekly series.  This made her the first woman to head a major studio and one of the most powerful women in Hollywood at the time. Ball founded Desilu Sales, Inc., for syndication which distributed Jay Ward Productions' Fractured Flickers in 1964. Today, Desilu Sales is part of CBS Media Ventures (formerly CBS Television Distribution).

During Ball's time as sole owner, Desilu developed popular series such as Mission: Impossible (1966), Mannix (1967), and Star Trek (1966). It has been falsely rumored that a Desilu loss during this time was Carol Burnett, who declined to star in a sitcom for the studio in favor of The Carol Burnett Show, a weekly variety show that lasted 11 seasons. In truth, Here's Agnes was offered to Burnett by CBS executives who attempted to dissuade her from having a variety show because they felt that men were better suited for them. Burnett and Ball, however, remained close friends, often guest-starring in each other's series.

In 1967, Ball agreed to sell her television company to Gulf+Western, which had only recently acquired Paramount Pictures. The company was renamed Paramount Television, and the former RKO main lot on Gower Street was absorbed into the adjacent Paramount lot. The old RKO globe logo is still in place. The company is now called CBS Studios (formerly CBS Television Studios). Perfect Film purchased Desilu Studios' other lot in Culver City in 1968.

Independent Arnaz 
Arnaz left television production for a few years but returned in 1966 when he formed his own company, Desi Arnaz Productions, based at Desilu. Desi Arnaz Productions, along with United Artists Television, co-produced The Mothers-in-Law for the National Broadcasting Company (NBC). Arnaz attempted to sell other television pilots, including a comedy with Carol Channing and an adventure series with Rory Calhoun. Neither series sold. Arnaz also tried to create a law drama called Without Consent, with Spencer Tracy as a defense attorney, but after several attempts at developing a suitable script failed and because of insurance concerns regarding Tracy's heavy drinking, the project was abandoned.

Independent Ball and Desilu Too 
After selling Desilu, Ball established her own new production company, Lucille Ball Productions (LBP), in 1968. The company went to work on her new series Here's Lucy that year. The program ran until 1974 and enjoyed several years of ratings success. Ball returned to network television in 1986 with the short-lived Life with Lucy. It lasted eight episodes before it was cancelled—a first for Ball—because of poor ratings. LBP continues to exist, and its primary purpose is residual sales of license rights for Here's Lucy.

Desilu-Paramount TV's holdings are owned by Paramount Global (formerly ViacomCBS), the owner of the pre-1960s shows. Desilu Productions Inc. was reincorporated in Delaware in 1967, by Paramount Pictures and still exists as a legal entity. Desilu Too LLC was later created by Lucie Arnaz mostly as a licensee for I Love Lucy-related merchandise. Desilu Too also partners with MPI Home Video and Lucille Ball Productions (formed by Ball and second husband Gary Morton) on the video releases of Here's Lucy and other material Ball and Arnaz made independently of each other. Desilu Too officials have worked with MPI Home Video for the home video reissue of The Mothers-In-Law. Paramount Home Entertainment (through CBS DVD) continues to hold DVD distribution rights to the CBS library. In November 2019 CBS Studios registered the DESILU trademark again to protect its previous Common Law trademark usage. Syndication rights for Here's Lucy were sold by Ball to Telepictures, which later merged with Lorimar Television and ultimately was folded into Warner Bros. Television. Warner Bros. Television is the show's current distributor, although MPI now holds home video rights under license from Lucille Ball Productions and Desilu Too.

Whether Desilu Too has interests in the Lucille Ball Desi Arnaz Museum & Center for Comedy in Jamestown, New York, is not known. Neither Desilu Too nor LBP operates as a production company.

Technological innovations 

Desilu began the creation of its productions using conventional film studio materials, production, and processing techniques. The use of these materials and techniques meant that the 35 mm negatives (the source material for copyright purposes) were immediately available for production and distribution of prints when the Lucy series went into syndication at local stations around the country. As such, no "lost" episodes of programs occurred, and no programs were recorded by kinescope from the television broadcast.

Through the use of film-studio production techniques, the content and quality of Desilu productions displayed a high standard relative to peers in television of the 1950s and '60s. Moreover, they were readily adaptable to both comedy and drama formats and were able to handle special effects or feature interior or exterior sets and locations with equal ease.

Television shows produced by or filmed at Desilu

Produced by Desilu

Filmed at Desilu 
Some of these programs were created and owned by Desilu; others were other production companies' programs that Desilu filmed or to which Desilu rented production space.

 The Jack Benny Program (CBS; 1950–1964 / NBC; 1964–1965)
 Make Room for Daddy/The Danny Thomas Show (ABC; 1953–1957 / CBS; 1957–1964)
 Private Secretary (CBS; 1953–1957)
 The Lineup (CBS; 1954–1960)
 The Adventures of Jim Bowie (ABC; 1956–1958)
 Wire Service (ABC; 1956–1957)
 Meet McGraw (NBC; 1957–1958)
 The Eve Arden Show (CBS; 1957–1958)
 The Real McCoys (ABC; 1957–1962 / CBS; 1962–1963)
 Man with a Camera (ABC; 1958–1960)
 Yancy Derringer (CBS; 1958–1959)
 The Andy Griffith Show (CBS; 1960–1968)
 The Barbara Stanwyck Show (NBC; 1960–1961)
 Here's Hollywood (NBC; 1960–1962)
 Harrigan and Son (ABC; 1960–1961)
 My Three Sons (ABC; 1960–1965 / CBS; 1965–1972)
 The Joey Bishop Show (NBC; 1961-1964 / CBS; 1964–1965)
 The Dick Van Dyke Show (CBS; 1961–1966)
 My Favorite Martian (CBS; 1963–1966)
 The Bill Dana Show (NBC; 1963–1965)
 The Bing Crosby Show (ABC; 1964–1965)
 My Living Doll (CBS; 1964–1965)
 Slattery's People (CBS; 1964–1965)
 Gomer Pyle, U.S.M.C. (CBS; 1964–1969)
 I Spy (NBC; 1965–1968)
 Hogan's Heroes (CBS; 1965–1971)
 Family Affair (CBS; 1966–1971)
 That Girl (ABC; 1966–1971)
 The Guns of Will Sonnett (ABC; 1967–1969)
 Rango (ABC; 1967)
 Accidental Family (NBC; 1967–1968)
 The Mothers-in-Law (NBC; 1967–1969)
 Good Morning World (CBS; 1967–1968)

References

External links 

 

 
Television production companies of the United States
Lucille Ball
Defunct film and television production companies of the United States
Entertainment companies based in California
Companies based in Los Angeles
American companies established in 1950
American companies disestablished in 1968
Entertainment companies established in 1950
Entertainment companies disestablished in 1968
Mass media companies established in 1950
Mass media companies disestablished in 1968
1950 establishments in California
1968 disestablishments in California
1968 mergers and acquisitions
Defunct companies based in Greater Los Angeles
1950s in American television
1960s in American television
Paramount Global subsidiaries
Predecessors of CBS Studios